The Murder of Captain Fryatt is a 1917 Australian silent film about the execution of Captain Charles Fryatt during World War I from John and Agnes Gavin. It is considered a lost film.

Plot
The Gavins claimed the plot "followed closely the facts contained in the official report of the British Admiralty" about the Fryatt incident, with a Belgian love story added. The film begins after Fryatt, the commander of a merchant ship, has rammed a German submarine, and has returned to London a hero. German spies seek to track him down. Fryatt goes on another voyage, is captured by the Germans and executed.

Cast
Harrington Reynolds as Captain Charles Fryatt
John Gavin as Von Kehlen
Olive Proctor as Mrs. Fryatt
Augustus Neville		
Charles Villiers		
Roland Watts-Phillips
Mabel Fish as Baby
Percy Walshe		
Clara Stevenson
Elsie Prince

Production
Fryatt's murder was one of the three best known German atrocities of World War I, the others being the sinking of the RMS Lusitania and the execution of Nurse Edith Cavell. Gavin sought official approval from the New South Wales Chief Secretary prior to making the film. This was given, provided the actual execution of Fryatt was not shown. Production was very swift – Fryatt was killed on 27 July 1916 and the film was ready for screening in February 1917. The script was reportedly based on British admiralty naval reports.

Agnes Gavin copyrighted her script on 17 February 1917.

The film was a follow-up to Gavin's popular hit The Martyrdom of Nurse Cavell (1916), the success of which enabled Gavin to take out a lease at a studio in North Sydney. He announced plans to make four films continuously, of which this was to be the first. During filming a sequence in North Sydney where soldiers raid a haunt of German spies, some bystanders joined in and had to be restrained by the police and John Gavin from smashing the plate glass in front of the shop. Reportedly over five hundred people were involved in the production.

Reception
Although the film's tone was similarly anti-German to Nurse Cavell it was not as successful at the box office.

References

External links

The Murder of Captain Fryatt at National Film and Sound Archive

1917 films
Australian black-and-white films
Australian silent feature films
Films directed by John Gavin
World War I films based on actual events
Lost Australian films
Silent war films
1917 lost films
Lost war films